Federal Route 136 (formerly Kedah state route K16 and Perak state route A16) is a federal road in Kedah and Perak state, Malaysia. The roads connects Kuala Ketil, Kedah in the north until Parit Buntar, Perak in the south. This road used to be 121.331 km long, but now it is only 84 km. The Malaysian Public Works Department (JKR) Kedah cut some corners because it is very dangerous, The corners is located near the Sungai Ular bridge. Kilometre Zero of the Federal Route 136 starts at Kuala Ketil, Kedah.

Features
At most sections, the Federal Route 136 was built under the JKR R5 road standard, allowing maximum speed limit of up to 90 km/h.

List of junctions

References

Malaysian Federal Roads